Oncotylus viridiflavus is a species of plant bugs belonging to the family Miridae, subfamily Phylinae. It is found in every country of Central, south Europe and Scandinavia.

References

Insects described in 1778
Hemiptera of Europe
Phylini